Mari Nishio (西尾 まり; born April 2, 1974) is a Japanese actress and former child actress.

Filmography

Film
 Tora-san Makes Excuses (1992)
 Dolls (2002) – Sawako's friend
 The Matsugane Potshot Affair (2006) – Yoko Togashi
 Again (2015) – Yamashita's wife

Television
 Taiyō ni Hoero! (1981) – Suzuko Kitahara
 Uchi no Ko ni Kagitte... (1984) – Izumi Suwa
 Papa wa Newscaster (1987) – Nishio Megumi
 Keizoku (1999) – Maiko Ōsawa
 AIBOU (2003) – Emi Takizawa
 Kagerō no Tsuji Inemuri Iwane Edo Zōshi (2007) – Setsu
 Smile (2009) – Rina's mother
 Meitantei no Okite (2009) – Masako Aoki
 Don Quixote (2011) – Reiko Okazaki
 Last Money: Ai no Nedan (2011) – Yoriko Yamamoto
 Ashita, Mama ga Inai (2014) – Otsubone's mother
 Masshiro (2015) – Toshie Hosaka
 Toto Neechan (2016) – Setsu Kudō
 Kahogo no Kahoko (2017) – Takashi Namiki

References

External links
Official website

1974 births
Living people
Japanese actresses